Honkawa-cho is a Hiroden station (tram stop) on Hiroden Main Line, located in Honkawa-cho 1-chome, Naka-ku, Hiroshima.

Routes
From Honkawa-cho Station, there are four of Hiroden Streetcar routes.

 Hiroshima Station - Hiroden-miyajima-guchi Route
 Hiroden-nishi-hiroshima - Hiroshima Port Route
 Hiroshima Station - Eba Route
 Yokogawa Station - Hiroden-honsha-mae Route

Connections
█ Main Line
   
Genbaku Dome-mae (Atomic Bomb Dome) — Honkawa-cho — Tokaichi-machi

Around station
Hiroshima City Honkawa Elementary School
Honkawa Elementary School Peace Museum
Hiroshima Peace Memorial Park
Hiroshima Peace Memorial
Children's Peace Monument
Hiroshima Peace Memorial Museum
KKR Hiroshimakinen Hospita

History
Opened as "Sakan-cho" on December 8, 1912.
Became a junction stop between Yokogawa Route and Others, on November 1, 1917.
Renamed to the present name "Honkawa-cho" on April 1, 1965.

See also
Hiroden Streetcar Lines and Routes

References 

Honkawa-cho Station
Railway stations in Japan opened in 1912